Highway 70 is a highway, 76 km in length, running through the Western Galilee region in the Northern District of Israel.  It connects the Mount Carmel region east of Zikhron Ya'akov to the Lower Galilee, Kiryat Ata, and Shlomi near Israel's border with Lebanon.
The highway runs concurrently with Highway 6 for 2.5 km between Ein Tut Interchange and Elyakim Interchange and for 4 km between Tel Qashish and Ha'Amakim Interchange, then with Highway 75 for 4 km between Ha'Amakim Interchange and Yagur Junction, then again with Highway 6 for 5 km between Givot Alonim Interchange and Somekh Interchange.

Description of the highway

Highway 70 begins east of Zikhron Ya'akov at Ein Tut interchange with Route 67 and Highway 6.  It goes northeast through Wadi Milk, reaching Yokneam.

After Yokneam the road turns northwest toward Yagur and Kfar Hasidim until Yagur junction, paralleling the Jezreel Valley railway, then turns north toward Kiryat Ata and Shefaram and afterward continues through the Western Galilee until Shlomi.

At the end of the 1990s, the two junctions near the southern end of the road, at Bat Shlomo and Elyakim, were reconstructed into interchanges, to enable uninterrupted travel from Shefaya junction to Yokneam junction.

Junctions & Interchanges on the highway

Part 1 – Ein Tut to Yokneam
 Ein Tut Interchange with Highway 67 and Highway 6 (opened July 20, 2009)
 Elyakim Interchange with Route 672 (opened July 20, 2009)
 Tel Qashish Interchange with Highway 6 and Highway 77
 Yokneam Junction
 Yokneam Illit Junction

Part 2 – Yokneam to Yagur 
 HaTishbi Junction with Highway 66 and Route 722
 HaAmakim Junction with Highway 75

Part 3 – Yagur to Kfar Yasif
 Yagur Interchange with Highway 75  
 Kfar Hasidim Junction
 Zevulun Valley Junction with Route 780
 Givot Alonim Interchange with Highway 6
 Somekh Interchange with Highway 79 and Highway 6
 Avlayim Junction with Route 781
 Tamra Junction
 Yavor Junction with Route 805
 Ahihud Junction with Highway 85
 Kfar Yasif Junction with Highway 85
There are plans to replace the two junctions at Ahihud and Kfar Yasif with one interchange.

Part 4 – Kfar Yasif to Hanita
 Yirka-Julis Junction
 Abu Sinan
 Yas'ur (kibbutz)
 Oshrat – Beit HaEmek
 Amka junction Route 859
 Sheikh Danun junction
 Netiv HaShayara junction
 HaShayara Junction
 Kabri Junction with Highway 89
 Avdon–Manot
 Matzuva junction
 Shlomi junction
 Hanita Junction with Route 899

See also
 List of highways in Israel

References

70